HMS Netley was originally the French privateer brig Déterminé, which the Royal Navy captured in 1807 and took into service. She was lost at sea on the Leeward Islands station in 1808.

French career and capture
Déterminé was a privateer brig commissioned in Bayonne in October 1803, that made her first cruise in October–November. She was recommissioned at Bordeaux circa 1805.

Lloyd's List (LL) reported on 12 August 1806 that the French privateer Déterminée had captured Betsey, Selby, master, and sent her into Cayenne. Betsey had been sailing from the Cape Verde islands to Suriname, and the capture took place nearer to Surinam.

 captured Déterminée, of Guadeloupe, on 18 January 1807 in the Atlantic Ocean 100 leagues (261 nmi; 300 mi; 483 km) east of Barbados after a chase of 16 hours. Déterminée was pierced for 20 guns but carried 14, and had a crew of 108 men. Her captors took Déterminée into .

The British took Déterminée into service as HMS Netley.

Fate
Netley was under the command of Lieutenant Charles Burman when she sank on 10 July 1808 when a squall caused her to capsize off Barbados. Of her crew of about 60 only a midshipman and eight crewmen survived until the 16-gun brig-sloop  rescued them.

Citations and references
Citations

References
 
 
 

1803 ships
Brigs of the Royal Navy
Maritime incidents in 1808
Shipwrecks in the Atlantic Ocean